IEAC may refer to:
 Institute for Euro-Atlantic Cooperation
 Independent estimate at completion, used in earned value management